The 1892 season was the ninth season of regional competitive association football in Australia. The were two league competitions and two cup competitions fielded by Northern District British Football Association (Northern NSW) and the South British Football Soccer Association (New South Wales).

League competitions

Cup competitions

(Note: figures in parentheses display the club's competition record as winners/runners-up.)

See also
 Soccer in Australia

References

Seasons in Australian soccer
1892 in Australian sport
Australian soccer by year
Australian soccer